Anna Maria Barbara Abesch (23 March 1706, Sursee – 15 February 1773, Sursee) was a Swiss reverse glass painter and the daughter of Johann Peter Abesch.

Abesch was the first professional reverse glass painter in Switzerland. More than 160 of her works (signed "ABVE") remain and more than 120 other works are attributed to her.

Her paintings generally depict Biblical scenes or saints, executed after mostly French engravings. They were highly regarded even during her lifetime and many remain in Swiss monasteries or private collections.

References

External links 

 

1706 births
1773 deaths
Swiss women painters
18th-century Swiss painters
18th-century Swiss women artists